Losers, Weepers is a studio album by Kay Starr. It was released in 1960 by Capitol Records (catalog no. T-1303). It was produced by Dave Cavanaugh. She is backed on the album by Van Alexander and his band. The album's liner notes state: "Kay Starr, working closely and skillfully with the musicians, so that each nuance of lyric, melody, and mood is carried out with full beauty and meaning."

Reception

Upon its release, Billboard magazine wrote: "Kay Starr sings the low-down, too-sad-for-tears blues, and the upbeat, rowdy, happy rhythms, and does well by all as evidenced by the selections in her new Capitol album, Losers, Weepers."

AllMusic also gave the album a rating of four stars. Reviewer Scott Yanow wrote that "Starr gives a jazz feeling to each of her dozen interpretations" and concluded his review: "Superior singing."

Track listing
Side A
 "You Always Hurt the One You Love"
 "I Should Care"
 "I'm a Fool to Care"
 "Don't Take Your Love from Me"
 "When I Lost You"
 "Only Forever"

Side B
 "Gonna get a Guy"
 "Please Don't Talk About Me When I'm Gone"
 "I Miss You So"
 "A Faded Summer Love"
 "When a Woman Loves a Man"
 "Into Each Life Some Rain Must Fall"

References

1960 albums
Kay Starr albums
Capitol Records albums